Juan Pedro López Pérez (born 31 July 1997) is a Spanish cyclist who currently rides for UCI WorldTeam . In October 2020, he was named in the startlist for the 2020 Vuelta a España.

Major results

2018
 7th Overall Giro della Valle d'Aosta
2019
 4th Overall Tour of Antalya
 6th Overall Tour de Hongrie
 9th Overall Giro della Valle d'Aosta
1st Stage 4
2022
 10th Overall Giro d'Italia
1st  Young rider classification
Held  after Stages 4–13

Grand Tour general classification results timeline

References

External links

1997 births
Living people
Spanish male cyclists
People from Lebrija
Sportspeople from the Province of Seville
Cyclists from Andalusia